Maurício Fernandes (born 5 July 1976), known simply as Maurício, is a Brazilian former footballer who played as a central defender.

Possessing a powerful shot which allowed him to score several goals from free kicks, he spent the vast majority of his professional career in Portugal, representing four clubs and amassing Primeira Liga totals of 141 games and 13 goals over the course of eight seasons.

Club career
Born in Passo Fundo, Rio Grande do Sul, Maurício did not start playing organised football until well into his 20s. He represented mainly modest sides in his country, with the exception of Fluminense FC in 2002, helping the Rio de Janeiro team to the Campeonato Carioca.

In August 2003, shortly after being released by Esporte Clube Juventude, Maurício signed with S.C. Braga in Portugal, being rarely used by the Minho side in three years (he was inclusively demoted to the reserves) and also being loaned to fellow Primeira Liga club C.F. Estrela da Amadora, where he excelled, scoring four goals as the team finished in mid-table in the 2005–06 season.

Subsequently returned to Braga, Maurício left for the Pohang Steelers of South Korea in the 2007 January transfer window. After appearing rarely in the K League 1 he returned to Portugal and former club Estrela, netting another four goals as it again managed to retain top-division status after finishing 13th, notably in a 2–2 home draw against eventual champions FC Porto.

After one year in Greece with Ergotelis FC, the 33-year-old Maurício returned once again to Portugal, joining C.D. Feirense of the Segunda Liga on a one-year contract. For the following campaign he returned to the top flight, with S.C. Olhanense.

Honours
Bahia
Campeonato Baiano: 2001
Campeonato do Nordeste: 2001

Fluminense
Campeonato Carioca: 2002

References

External links

Futebol de Goyaz profile 

1976 births
Living people
People from Passo Fundo
Sportspeople from Rio Grande do Sul
Brazilian footballers
Association football defenders
Campeonato Brasileiro Série A players
Campeonato Brasileiro Série B players
Campeonato Brasileiro Série C players
Itumbiara Esporte Clube players
Sociedade Esportiva Recreativa e Cultural Brasil players
Grêmio Esportivo Brasil players
Associação Chapecoense de Futebol players
Vila Nova Futebol Clube players
Esporte Clube Bahia players
Fluminense FC players
Esporte Clube Juventude players
Primeira Liga players
Liga Portugal 2 players
Segunda Divisão players
S.C. Braga players
S.C. Braga B players
C.F. Estrela da Amadora players
C.D. Feirense players
S.C. Olhanense players
K League 1 players
Pohang Steelers players
Super League Greece players
Ergotelis F.C. players
Brazilian expatriate footballers
Expatriate footballers in Portugal
Expatriate footballers in South Korea
Expatriate footballers in Greece
Brazilian expatriate sportspeople in Portugal
Brazilian expatriate sportspeople in South Korea
Brazilian expatriate sportspeople in Greece